Termanu is a Central Malayo-Polynesian language of Roti Island, off Timor, Indonesia. Speakers of Korbafo and Bokai dialects are ethnically distinct.

References

Sources 

 
 
 

Timor–Babar languages
Languages of Indonesia